Cliff Almond was a former Australian professional soccer player who played as a forward. He was an international player for the Australia national soccer team.

His 24-year career included three spells at Cessnock, a brief stint at North Shore and played with Scottish club Stirling Albion playing eight league games. He reportedly played 464 games at club level, with more than 400 appearances at Cessnock.

Early life
Cliff Almond was born in 1930. Growing up, he was a local colliery clerk until he changed to playing soccer.

Club career

1946–54: Cessnock and North Shore stint
Almond progressed from the Aberdare Rangers youth team in 1946, where he signed for Cessnock as a right winger. He first played for Cessnock at age 15 in the 1946 Gardiner Cup with big impressions from spectators.

He made a brief stint at Sydney club North Shore for a year in 1947.

1954–69: English trials and third Cessnock spell
During mid-1954, Cliff Almond was set to travel to England to trial with English clubs Aston Villa and Newcastle United. He then played for Scottish club Stirling Albion on 31 December 1954 and played eight league games in the 1954–55 season.

He returned to Cessnock in 1955, where he moved to a defensive position and began his international career with the NSW state representative team and the Australia national soccer team. Almond played his final match for Cessnock in the Northern NSW top division at age 38.

International career
Almond was selected as part of Australia's five-test match series against South Africa and played three games as captain. He was also selected for the NSW state representative side against South Africa in August 1955.

Death
Cliff Almond died on 4 November 2018 at age 88 in his hometown Cessnock, Australia. His obituary was featured on 9 November 2018.

Career statistics

International

Honours

 Cessnock
 Northern NSW Division One Premiership: 1954, 1955, 1956, 1960
 Northern NSW Division One Championship: 1960

References

Australian soccer players
Association football defenders
Association football forwards
Australia international soccer players
People from the Hunter Region
Sportsmen from New South Wales
Soccer players from New South Wales